Hama Assah is a Nigerien lawmaker, and head of the defense and security committee of the National Assembly.

References

Living people
Members of the National Assembly (Niger)
Year of birth missing (living people)